New England Hockey Conference (formerly the ECAC East) is a college athletic conference which operates in the northeastern United States. It participates in the NCAA's Division III as a hockey-only conference.



History
The New England Hockey Conference began as ECAC East in 1984 when ECAC 2 was split in two and both new conferences dropped down to Division III. The conference was fairly stable for the first decade but began to grow in the mid 1990s. In 1998 four teams left to become Division I programs in the new MAAC conference. A year later, nine more teams split off to join their primary athletic conference, NESCAC, followed by the women's programs in 2001. Membership numbers held steady over the succeeding 15 years, though several teams came and went. In 2015 the conference rebranded itself as the New England Hockey Conference, but no internal changes occurred. Two years later 6 women's and 2 men's programs left to join a variety of conferences, dropping league membership to 11 schools, the lowest number in conference history.

Standings
From the time it formally split from ECAC 2 until 1992 all games played between members of ECAC East and ECAC West counted for conference standings. In 1992, after the ECAC West split into two conferences, ECAC East only counted games within their conference for the standings, but because a formal schedule was not yet in place all games between members were still counted. For the 1993-94 season ECAC East had its first official conference schedule with all 18 teams playing each other once. Teams could schedule additional inter-conference games but only one would count in the standings. In 1999, when 9 teams left to form the ice hockey division of the NESCAC, the two conferences continued to count games between one another in their respective standings. This arrangement continued even after the addition of more programs.

NEHC Tournaments

Current members
There are 12 member schools; the men's division has ten members, while the women's division has nine members. (as of November 2018)

Former members

† (as of November 2018)

Membership timeline

See also
 New England Women's Hockey Alliance

References

External links
Men's official web site
Women's official web site

 
NCAA Division III ice hockey conferences
Ice hockey in New England